The Yorba Linda Water District is a public agency responsible for water supply and quality for residents of the entire city of Yorba Linda, California, approximately one third of Placentia, small portions of Brea and Anaheim, and the two unincorporated county territories that are in and adjacent to Yorba Linda, which are known as spheres of influence due to their occasional subjection to annexation.

Structure

It is governed by a locally elected Board of Directors. The members of the Board are directly accountable to the residents of the community. As of 2022, the President of the Board is J. Wayne Miller, PhD, the Vice President is Brooke Jones, and the other three members of the board are Trudi DesRoches, Phil Hawkins, and Tom Lindsey, whose titles are all Director. The Directors are elected to four-year terms by the registered voters within the District and establishes policies and programs leading to the achievement of the District's mission. The Yorba Linda Water District Board of Directors' meetings are held on the second and fourth Tuesdays of each month at the District office located at 1717 E. Miraloma Ave. in Placentia.

The departments operating under the general manager's direction are administration, engineering, finance, human resources, and operations.

See also
 Metropolitan Water District of Southern California
 Yorba Linda, California
 Orange County, California
 Shell Oil Company

References

External links
 

Government in Orange County, California
Water management authorities in California
Public utilities of the United States
Placentia, California
Yorba Linda, California